() is a large Japanese oil and natural gas company based in Tokyo, Japan and specialised in exploring, developing, producing, selling, buying and refining oil and natural gas.

References

External links

 Archived website
 Japanese page
 English page

Non-renewable resource companies established in 2003
Energy companies established in 2003
Companies listed on the Tokyo Stock Exchange
Oil companies based in Tokyo
Holding companies based in Tokyo
Privately held companies of Japan
Japanese companies established in 2003
Holding companies established in 2003